Vadamarachchi lagoon is a lagoon in Jaffna District, northern Sri Lanka. The lagoon is sometimes referred to as Thondamannar lagoon. The lagoon separates the Vadamarachchi region from the Valikamam and Thenmarachchi regions.

The lagoon is connected to the Indian Ocean by a narrow channel to the north, near the town of Thondamannar. The lagoon's water is brackish to saline. There is a sluice gate at Thondamannar to prevent sea water entering the lagoon.

The lagoon is surrounded by a densely populated region containing palmyra palms, coconut palm, grassland, rice paddies, arid scrubland and open forest.

The lagoon has extensive mudflats, seagrass beds and mangrove swamps, particularly Avicennia. The lagoon attracts a wide variety of water birds including American flamingoes, ducks, gulls, terns and other shorebirds.

References

Bodies of water of Jaffna District
Lagoons of Sri Lanka